December riots may refer to:

Jeltoqsan, December 1986 riots in Almaty, Kazakhstan
December 2001 riots in Argentina
 Copenhagen December riots, 2003
2005 Cronulla riots, Sydney, Australia
Copenhagen December Riot, 2006
2008 Malmö mosque riots
2008 Greek riots
1 December 2013 Euromaidan riots
December 2013 Stockholm riots